Passiflora aurantia, the orange-petaled passion flower, is a species in the family Passifloraceae which produces inedible fruit. It is native to New Caledonia and Australia.

References

aurantia
Flora of New Caledonia
Flora of New South Wales
Flora of Norfolk Island
Flora of Queensland